The Barrett Optical Ranging System (BORS) is an integrated ballistics computer manufactured by Barrett Firearms that aids snipers and long-range marksmen in taking precise and accurate shots. The system mounts directly to the riflescope and couples with the elevation knob. With the aid of the BORS, marksmen can rapidly account for temperature, barometric pressure and aiming at an upward or downward angle.

Design and features

The computer built into the BORS, constantly updates to account for changing factors. Barrett states that the BORS "instantly takes care of the data work so the shooter can focus on the task of putting lead on target." It takes data from thousands of tables and accounts for a number of real-time external factors automatically giving the shooter the exact yardage at which a bullet will hit its target.

Since the BORS is mounted directly to the scope and coupled with the elevation knobs, the computer can interact with the scope by simply turning the elevation knob until the LCD displays the target’s range.

The kit includes the proprietary Barrett Ballistic Software that is pre-programmed with a library selected by Barrett. It also includes a cable that allows users to program custom loads on their computer and transfer them directly to the BORS.

Use
While designed to withstand military operations, the BORS is also available for civilian sale and can be used by long-range marksmen including target shooters and hunters. The BORS was used by Ukrainian forces in the 2022 Russian invasion of Ukraine, a unit fitted onto a Barrett M107A1 rifle was captured by Russian forces.

References

External links 
 Official Website
 BORS User Manual

Barrett firearms